Thomas Johnson (by 1519 – July 1569) was an English politician.

He was a Member (MP) of the Parliament of England for Bossiney in March 1553 and St. Albans in October 1553.

References

1569 deaths
Members of the Parliament of England for Bossiney
Year of birth uncertain
English MPs 1553 (Edward VI)
English MPs 1553 (Mary I)
Members of the Parliament of England for constituencies in Hertfordshire